Events from the year 1123 in Ireland.

Incumbents
High King of Ireland: Toirdelbach Ua Conchobair

Events

Maollosa O'Conchubhair receives the Cross of Cong

References